Roman Grzegorz Ogaza (17 November 1952 – 5 March 2006) was a Polish football player.

Life and work

Roman Ogaza was born 17 November in Katowice. He was a striker. His first club was Górnik Lędziny (1965–1968 and after fusion GKS Tychy), next clubs: Górnik Zabrze (1968–1970), Szombierki Bytom (1970–1975 and 1978–1983), French teams: RC Lens (1983–1984) and Olympique Alès (1984–1986), US Forbach (1987–1991) and SG Marienau (1991) and Belgian Royal Francs Borains (1986).

He clinched Polish championship with Szombierki Bytom in 1980. His debut with the Poland national team was in Port-au-Prince on 13 April 1974 against Haiti. Ogaza's last appearance with the national team was against Portugal on 23 February 1981. Ogaza played 21 matches for the Poland national team, scoring 6 goals. With many great players to choose from, Kazimierz Górski did not pick Ogaza for the 1974 World Cup in West Germany, but 2 years later, Ogaza was a member of the Poland Olympic team which brought home silver from Montreal in 1976

Roman Ogaza died in Forbach, near Metz, in March 2006, at the age of 53.

References

External links

Sportspeople from Katowice
1952 births
2006 deaths
Polish footballers
Polish expatriate footballers
Poland international footballers
Footballers at the 1976 Summer Olympics
Olympic footballers of Poland
Olympic silver medalists for Poland
GKS Tychy players
Górnik Zabrze players
RC Lens players
Olympique Alès players
Expatriate footballers in France
Ligue 1 players
Ligue 2 players
Olympic medalists in football
Szombierki Bytom players
Medalists at the 1976 Summer Olympics
Association football forwards
Polish expatriate sportspeople in France
Francs Borains players